This is a list of works published by Sir Andrew Halliday, K.B.E., M.D.

Books written by Halliday

 Other ebooks available at:
 and 
 and 

 Republished:

Articles written by Halliday
 Reprinted:

Books edited by Halliday
 Published posthumously.

Bibliographies of Scottish writers
Scottish literature
Works by Scottish writers